Phillip Bernard Daniels (born March 4, 1973) is a former American football defensive end and coach who most recently served as defensive line coach for the Philadelphia Eagles of the National Football League (NFL). He was drafted by the Seattle Seahawks in the fourth round of the 1996 NFL Draft. He played college football at the University of Georgia.

Daniels has also played for the Chicago Bears and Washington Redskins.

Early years
Daniels attended Seminole County High School (Donalsonville, GA) and lettered in football, basketball, and baseball.

College career
Daniels attended and played college football at the University of Georgia. While there he played three different positions. As a sophomore, he played defensive tackle, linebacker as a junior, and finally defensive end as a senior and served as team captain.

Professional career

Seattle Seahawks
Daniels was drafted by the Seattle Seahawks in the fourth round of the 1996 NFL Draft. He played for the team from 1996 to 1999.

Chicago Bears
Daniels signed with the Chicago Bears before the 2000 season and played for them until 2003.

Washington Redskins
Daniels signed with the Washington Redskins as an unrestricted free agent in 2004. On December 18, 2005, he had career high four sacks and also recovered a fumble in a 35–7 win over the Dallas Cowboys and was named the NFC defensive player of the week.

Daniels was released by the Redskins on July 28, 2011. Head coach Mike Shanahan said that he saw Daniels as a coach or in a front office somewhere because of the way he prepare and handles himself and Daniels was hired the following year as the Washington Redskins Director of Player Development.

Post-playing career
On February 17, 2012, Daniels was hired as the director of player development of the Washington Redskins.

Daniels coached the defensive line in the 1st Annual NFLPA All-Star game. He was hired by the Philadelphia Eagles as Assistant Defensive Line Coach on January 20, 2016. Daniels won his first Super Bowl ring when the Eagles defeated the New England Patriots in Super Bowl LII.

On February 8, 2019, Daniels was promoted internally to become the Eagles' defensive line coach, replacing Chris Wilson, whose contract had expired. On January 17, 2020, it was reported that Daniels would not return to the Eagles' coaching staff in 2020 which was surprise move after having the best unit on the team finishing 3rd vs the run and 11 in sacks with a slew of injuries at the DT position.

Personal life
Daniels and his wife, Leslie, have four children; two sons, DaVaris and DaKendrick, and two daughters, Damara and DaKiya. His son, DaVaris, played college football as a wide receiver for the University of Notre Dame. Furthermore, he is the uncle of T. J. Jones, a former wide receiver at the University of Notre Dame, who was drafted in the sixth round of the 2014 NFL Draft by the Detroit Lions.  Phillip Daniels is a member of Phi Beta Sigma fraternity, having joined while at the University of Georgia.

References

External links
Washington Redskins bio

1973 births
Living people
African-American players of American football
American football defensive ends
Georgia Bulldogs football players
Seattle Seahawks players
Chicago Bears players
Washington Redskins players
People from Donalsonville, Georgia
Players of American football from Georgia (U.S. state)
Philadelphia Eagles coaches
21st-century African-American sportspeople
20th-century African-American sportspeople
Ed Block Courage Award recipients
Houston Gamblers (2022) coaches
Brian Piccolo Award winners